This is a list of currently existing art museums, museums of fine arts, and art galleries in Ukraine, arranged in accordance with the current administrative division of the state. The list includes mainly state museums. Many of these museums are at risk due to the 2022 Russian invasion of Ukraine.

Museums within sections by region or administration are presented in the following sequence: first, state museum institutions in the administrative center of the region. Departments or branches of the previously specified institution are marked with (**).

See also the list of museums in Ukraine, which replicates much, but not all, of this material.

Kyiv 

National Art Museum of Ukraine
 
 Museum of Western and Oriental Art
 Kyiv Children's Art Gallery 
 
 National Museum of Ukrainian Folk Decorative Art 
 National Center of Folk Culture "Ivan Honchar Museum" 
 National Museum of Folk Architecture and Life of Ukraine 
 Museum of Books and Publishing of Ukraine 
 Museum of Theater, Music and Cinema of Ukraine

Sevastopol 
 Mikhail Kroshitsky Sevastopol Art Museum

Autonomous Republic of Crimea 

 Simferopol Art Museum
 Aivazovsky National Art Gallery
 Art Gallery in Kerch (Department of the Kerch State Historical and Cultural Reserve)
 Museum of Vera Mukhina

Vinnytsia Oblast 
 Vinnytsia Art Museum
 Shargorodsky Museum of Fine Arts
 Yampilsky Museum of Fine Arts

Volyn Oblast 
 Art Department of the Volyn Museum of Local Lore, Lutsk

Dnipropetrovsk Oblast 
 Dnipropetrovsk Art Museum

Donetsk Oblast 
 Donetsk Art Museum
 Makyvsky Museum of Art and Local Lore
 Druzhkivsky Art Museum
 Kramatorsky Art Museum
 Gorlivsky Art Museum
 Kuindzhi Art Museum, Mariupol
 Exhibition hall named after A. I. Kuindzhi (branch of the Mariupol Museum of Local Lore)

Zhytomyr Oblast 

 Zhytomyr Art Museum (department of the Zhytomyr Museum of Local Lore)
 Kmytiv Museum of Fine Arts named after JD Bukhanchuk
 Museum of Domestic Ukrainian Icons

Zakarpattia Oblast 
 Transcarpathian Regional Art Museum of Joseph Bokshay

Zaporizhzhia Oblast 
 Zaporizhsky Art Museum
 Berdyansky Art Museum named after I. I. Brodsky
 Energodarsky Art Exhibition Hall

Ivano-Frankivsk Oblast 

 Ivano-Frankivsk Regional Art Museum
 Rogatynsky Museum of Art and Local Lore
 Pysanka Museum, Kolomyia

Kyiv Oblast 
 Yagotynska Art Gallery

Kirovohrad Oblast 

 Kirovohrad Regional Art Museum
 O. O. Osmorkin Art Memorial Museum

Luhansk Oblast 
 Luhansk Art Museum
 Stakhanov Historical and Art Museum

Lviv Oblast 

 Borys Voznytsky Lviv National Art Gallery
Lviv Municipal Art Center
Andrey Sheptytsky National Museum of Lviv
 Olena Kulchytska Art Memorial Museum, Lviv
 Oleksa Novakivsky Art Memorial Museum, Lviv
 Leopold Levitsky Art Memorial Museum, Lviv
 Mykhaila Bilas Art Museum, Truskavets
 Ivan Trush Art Memorial Museum, Lviv
 Sokalshchyna Art Museum, Chervonograd
 Boykivshchyna Art Museum, Sambir

Mykolaiv Oblast 

 The V. V. Vereshchagin Mykolaiv Art Museum
 Ochakivsky Museum of Marine Painting named after R. Sudkovsky
 E. Kibrik Ascension Art Museum

Odessa Oblast 

 Odesa Art Museum
 Ananyiv Historical Art Museum
 Odessa Museum of Western and Eastern Art
 Izmail Art Gallery
 Museum of Fine Arts of the Black Sea named after O. M. Bilo

Poltava Oblast 
 Poltava Art Museum
 Kremenchutska Urban Art Gallery
 Natalia Yuzefovych Art Gallery, Kremenchuk

Sumy Oblast 

 Nikanor Onatsky Regional Art Museum in Sumy
 Lebedyn Municipal Art Museum

Ternopil Oblast 

 Ternopil Regional Art Museum
 I. Khvorostetsky Memorial Art Museum (Department of the Kremenetsky Museum of Local Lore), Pochaiv

Kharkiv Oblast 

 Fine Arts Museum Kharkiv
 Museum of Folk Art, Kharkiv
 Parkhomivsky Historical Art Museum
 Laureate of the State Prize I. Repin Gallery, Chuguiv
 Kharkiv Municipal Gallery
 I. Repin Chuguiv Historical and Cultural Reserve

Kherson Oblast 

 Kherson Art Museum named after Oleksii Shovkunenko
 Novokakhovska Art Gallery

Khmelnytskyi Oblast 

 Khmelnytsky Art Museum
 Art Gallery (Kamyanets-Podilsky State Historical and Cultural Museum)

Cherkasy Oblast 

 Cherkasy Art Museum
 Uman Art Gallery (Department of Uman Local Lore)
 Korsun-Shevchenkivska Art Gallery

Chernivtsi Oblast 

 Chernivtsi Art Museum

Chernihiv Oblast 

 Chernihiv Regional Art Museum
 Art gallery in the village of Lemeshi (Chernihiv Raion)
 Borzna Art Memorial Museum "Estate of the People's Artist of Ukraine O. Saenko," Borzna

See also

List of museums in Ukraine

Notes

References

 Ukrainian Soviet Encyclopedia: in 12 volumes/ch. ed. M. P. Bazhan; editor: OK Antonov and others. – 2nd type. – Kyiv: Main Editorial Office of URE, 1974–1985.
 Resolution of the Cabinet of Ministers of Ukraine "On approval of the list of museums that store museum collections and museum objects that are state property and belong to the state part of the Museum Fund of Ukraine" of February 2, 2000 N 209 (as amended by the Resolutions of the Cabinet of Ministers № 1402 (1402-2003-n) dated 04.09.2003 and № 889 (889-2005-n) dated 12.09.2005) on the Official Website of the Verkhovna Rada of Ukraine.

Ukraine

Museums
Museums
Ukraine
Museums
Museums in Ukraine
Ukraine